The Chinese Mining Camp Archaeological Site near Warren, Idaho is an archaeological site which was listed on the National Register of Historic Places in 1994.

It is located about one mile northwest of the town of Warren, up a trail from the north end of Warren's airstrip.  It "occupies a cultural island which consists of approximately 2,500 square meters or 0.62 acres".  The site was investigated by an archaeological study in 1989–1992.

References

National Register of Historic Places in Idaho County, Idaho
Archaeological sites on the National Register of Historic Places in Idaho
Chinese-American culture in Idaho
Mining in Idaho